Mount Lovenia is a  mountain summit located on the common border that Duchesne County shares with Summit County in the U.S. state of Utah.

Description
Mount Lovenia is set within the High Uintas Wilderness on land managed by Ashley National Forest. It is situated along the crest of the Uinta Mountains which are a subset of the Rocky Mountains, and it ranks as the 10th-highest summit in Utah, and 51st-highest in the United States if a 400-foot clean prominence cutoff is considered as criteria. Topographic relief is significant as the west face rises  in less than one-half mile and the north face rises  in one-half mile. Neighbors include Wasatch Peak two miles to the north-northwest, and Dead Horse Peak is five miles to the west-southwest. Precipitation runoff from this mountain drains north to the Blacks Fork and south into headwaters of the Lake Fork River.

Etymology

The landform's toponym has been officially adopted by the U.S. Board on Geographic Names. Nature-lover and artist George Beard (1854–1944) of Coalville, Utah, named this mountain for his wife, Sarah Lovenia Bullock Beard (1859–1932), who was the daughter of Mormon pioneer Thomas Bullock.

Climate
Based on the Köppen climate classification, Mount Lovenia is located in a subarctic climate zone with cold snowy winters and mild summers. Tundra climate characterizes the summit and highest slopes.

See also
 Geology of the Uinta Mountains
 Thirteener
 List of mountains in Utah
 Explorer Peak

References

External links
 Mount Lovenia: weather forecast
 Mount Lovenia: Mountain-forecast.com
 Sarah Lovenia Bullock Beard (photo): Findagrave.com
 Photo of George and Lovenia Beard

Mountains of Utah
Features of the Uinta Mountains
Mountains of Duchesne County, Utah
Mountains of Summit County, Utah
North American 4000 m summits
Ashley National Forest